Extreme points of Serbia and Montenegro may refer to:

 Extreme points of Montenegro
 Extreme points of Serbia